David Mostyn is a British cartoonist and commercial illustrator who drew for D.C. Thomson from the early 1980s until the 2010s.

Career
Mostyn works out of Oxford, England.

Appearances
He has appeared at the Edinburgh Festival along with a poet named Roger McGough. He has also appeared on BBC TV and BBC Radio. Mostyn has also gotten together with famous author Philip Pullman, Richard Hammond, comedian David Williams, and writer Gyles Brandreth.

Works
He was the creator of several comic strips:
Bertie Buncle (The Dandy, 1978–1982)
Extra Terrestrial Teacher (School Fun, 1983–1984)
Strange Hill (Dandy, 1986–2004)
Danny's Nanny (The Beano 1988–1994)
Meet Edd: He's a Ghost (The Beezer and The Topper, 1991–1993)
Molly (Dandy, 1991–2004)
Cowerin' Wolf (Dandy, 1995-?)
Hector Spectre (Dandy, 1996-?)
Medieval Knievel (Dandy, 2003?)
Eddie The Ghost (Dandy, 2004)
Hugh Dunnit (Beano, 2005)
Dr. Doctor (Dandy, 2010)                                       
Disaster Chef (Dandy, 2011)

Mostyn has also worked for various jokebooks.

Mostyn's portfolio includes work for:

Penguin Books
Random House
The Pearson Group
Oxford University Press
DC Thomson
Marvel Comics
DC Comics New York
Constable Robinson
Arcturus Publishing
Andre Deutsch
Disney (Books)
Walker Books
BBC Publications
Lintas

References

External links
 official website

British comics artists
British illustrators
Living people
The Dandy people
The Beano people
Year of birth missing (living people)